Peter Lawrence may refer to:

Peter Lawrence (pirate) (fl. 1693–1705), Dutch privateer and pirate (real name Pieter Laurens)
Peter Lawrence (anthropologist) (1921–1987), British-born Australian anthropologist
Peter Lawrence (author), American author and screenwriter
Peter Anthony Lawrence (born 1941), English developmental biologist
Peter Lawrence (politician), New York State Assembly member elected 2014
Peter Lawrence (teacher) (1913–2005), British teacher and author
Peter Lee Lawrence (1945–1974), German actor
Peter Max Lawrence (born 1977), American contemporary artist
Peter B. Lawrence, British amateur astronomer
Pete Lawrence (born 1957), musician
Peter Gordon Lawrence, founder of PGL, a provider of school activity courses and summer camps 
Peter Godfrey Lawrence (1920–1953), aviator